This is a list of the National Register of Historic Places listings in Oxford County, Maine.

This is intended to be a complete list of the properties and districts on the National Register of Historic Places in Oxford County, Maine, United States. Latitude and longitude coordinates are provided for many National Register properties and districts; these locations may be seen together in a map.

There are 100 properties and districts listed on the National Register in the county.  One property was once listed, but as since been delisted.

Current listings

|}

Former listing

|}

See also

 List of National Historic Landmarks in Maine
 National Register of Historic Places listings in Maine

References

Oxford